The Impact Year End Awards (formerly known as TNA Year End Awards) is a concept used by Impact Wrestling, formerly known as Total Nonstop Action Wrestling, where awards, similar to the Academy and Grammy Awards, are given to professional wrestlers and other individuals within Impact Wrestling, such as commentators and managers.

Total Nonstop Action Wrestling era

2003 TNA Year End Awards 
The award winners were announced during a Weekly Pay-per view show. The winners were announced by Mike Tenay in the ring.

2004 TNA Year End Awards 
The award winners were announced during a Weekly Pay-per view show. The winners were announced by Mike Tenay in the ring.

2005 TNA Year End Awards 
The award winners were announced on the January 14, 2006 episode of TNA iMPACT!. The winners were shown in a video package.

2006 TNA Year End Awards 
The award winners were announced on the December 27, 2006 episode of TNA iMPACT!. The winners were shown in a video package.

2007 TNA Year End Awards 
The award winners were announced on the January 28, 2008 episode of TNA iMPACT!. The winners were shown in a video package.

2014 TNA Year End Awards 
The award winners were announced on the January 7, 2015 episode of TNA iMPACT!. The winners were shown in a video package.

Impact Wrestling era

2018 Impact Best of 2018 Fans' Choice Awards 
The award winners were announced on Impact Wrestling's Twitch channel on the Impact Best of 2018 Fans' Choice Awards Reveal, with Alicia Atout and Anthony Carelli, Behind the Lights Episode 34 stream.

2019 Impact Wrestling Awards

2020 Impact Wrestling Awards

2021 Impact Wrestling Awards

2022 Impact Wrestling Awards 
The award winners were announced on the December 29, 2022 episode of Impact!.

See also 
 List of professional wrestling awards
 List of Pro Wrestling Illustrated awards
 List of Wrestling Observer Newsletter awards
 Slammy Awards

References

Professional wrestling awards
Awards established in 2003
Professional wrestling-related lists
Impact Wrestling